Abbia may refer to:

 Abbia: Cameroon Cultural Review, a journal
 Abbia (game), an African game of chance
 Old German name for Abja (now part of Abja-Paluoja, Estonia)